Melissa Lantsman  is a Canadian politician and public relations executive who serves as the Member of Parliament for Thornhill in the House of Commons of Canada. A member of the Conservative Party of Canada, she was elected in the 2021 Canadian federal election. Lanstman is the first openly gay and first Jewish woman ever elected as a Conservative MP. Upon Pierre Poilievre's election as Conservative Leader, he named Lantsman one of two deputy leaders along with Edmonton MP Tim Uppal.

Lantsman previously worked as a communications advisor to several cabinet members in the 28th Canadian Ministry of Prime Minister Stephen Harper. She was a senior advisor to the Progressive Conservative Party of Ontario and its chief spokesperson during the 2018 Ontario provincial election. Lantsman was previously the National Vice President of Public Affairs at Enterprise Canada, a strategic communications firm.

In 2020, upon Peter Kent's retirement from Parliament, Lantsman announced her intention to seek the federal Conservative nomination in Thornhill. She defeated the incumbent Progressive Conservative Member of Provincial Parliament, Gila Martow, to become the riding's Conservative candidate on March 17, 2021.

Lantsman was elected to parliament on September 20, 2021, and sworn into office on October 28. Since November that year, she has served as the Shadow Minister of Transport in the Opposition Shadow Cabinet of Erin O'Toole.

Lantsman was elected the vice-chair of the Parliamentary Standing Committee on Transport and Infrastructure.

Early life and education 
Lantsman was born in Toronto in 1984 to a Russian Jewish family and raised in Thornhill. Her mother was an accountant and her father was an engineer who worked in the taxi business and ran several pawn shops. She attended a French-immersion program at Langstaff Secondary School in York Region and speaks fluent French in addition to English and Russian. Lantsman has one brother.

She attended University of Toronto and graduated with an Honours Bachelor of Arts. She later pursued graduate studies at the University of Ottawa and Rotman School of Management.

Career 

As an adolescent, Lantsman volunteered for Conservative Party candidates in local elections. During the 2008 Canadian federal election, she was appointed a senior communications advisor, with the party forming a minority government. Thereafter, she was appointed director of communications for the Ministry of Foreign Affairs under Ministers Lawrence Cannon and John Baird, serving from 2008 to 2011. From 2011 to 2012, she was the director of communications of the Office of the Prime Minister of Canada, and accompanied Prime Minister Stephen Harper on domestic and foreign visits.

After a brief stint at The Coca-Cola Company as a senior public affairs advisor, Lantsman returned to government as director of communications for the Ministry of Finance under Joe Oliver. Following the Harper government's loss of the 2015 Canadian federal election, Lantsman returned to the private sector as a senior director for CIBC Capital Markets.

In 2018, Lantsman served as director of communications for Ontario MPP Caroline Mulroney's candidacy for leadership of the Progressive Conservative Party of Ontario. After Mulroney's loss, Lantsman joined the Progressive Conservative Party of Ontario's campaign for the 2018 Ontario general election as its chief spokesperson and war room director. In this role, she oversaw all press communications and social media releases by the campaign. The election resulted in a majority government for the Progressive Conservatives, the first since 2002 after 16 years of Liberal government in Ontario. After the election, Lantsman joined Hill+Knowlton Strategies, an international public relations strategy firm, at its Toronto office. In 2020, she joined Enterprise Canada, a strategic public relations consultancy, as its vice president for National Public Affairs. She relinquished her partnership in Enterprise in 2021 to focus on her political candidacy.

Since 2019, Lantsman has appeared on the Canadian Broadcasting Corporation News' Power & Politics as well as CTV's Power Play as a political panelist and has hosted a radio show on CFRB 1010 AM. She has sat on the board of the Canadian Jewish Political Affairs Committee, the Hot Docs Canadian International Documentary Festival, Jewish Addiction Community Services (JACS) and the Michael Garron Hospital in Toronto.

Political candidacy 
In 2020, Conservative then-Member of Parliament for Thornhill Peter Kent announced that he would not seek reelection at the next year's federal election. Kent had represented the electoral district since 2008. The riding has Canada's highest proportion of Jewish residents, at 37%.

Lantsman announced her candidacy for the Conservative nomination on November 27, 2020. She was endorsed by former Prime Minister Stephen Harper, Alberta Premier Jason Kenney, former federal ministers John Baird, Joe Oliver, Pierre Poilievre, Rona Ambrose, Michelle Rempel Garner and Lisa Raitt, and incumbent Ontario provincial ministers Caroline Mulroney, Stephen Lecce, Greg Rickford and Paul Calandra. She was also endorsed by federal and provincial Conservative legislators, including Eric Duncan, Scott Aitchison, Logan Kanapathi, Stan Cho, Roman Baber and Vijay Thanigasalam.

Lantsman faced the incumbent Member of Provincial Parliament for Thornhill, Gila Martow, in the nomination contest. She participated in a series of nomination debates with Martow between December 2020 and March 2021. On April 3, 2021, Lantsman defeated Martow in the nomination election and was certified as the Conservative candidate for Thornhill. She faced Liberal candidate Gary Gladstone in the 2021 Canadian federal election on September 20 and, per preliminary results, won the seat with 51.3% of the vote.

44th Parliament (2021–present) 
Lantsman was sworn into the 44th Canadian Parliament on October 26, 2021. On November 9, she was appointed by Erin O'Toole to serve as the Shadow Minister of Transport.

On February 16, 2022, in response to a question raised by Lantsman regarding the usage of the Emergencies Act, Prime Minister Justin Trudeau replied, "Conservative Party members can stand with people who wave swastikas." Lantsman responded, "I am a strong Jewish woman and a member of this House and the descendant of Holocaust survivors. I have never been made to feel less except for today when the Prime Minister accused me of standing with swastikas. I think he owes me an apology. I'd like an apology." Trudeau did not respond to Lantsman's request.

On February 27, Candice Bergen appointed Lantsman to serve in the Conservative Party leadership team as Chair of Outreach in addition to her role as Shadow Minister of Transport.

After the September 2022 Conservative Party of Canada leadership election, new Opposition Leader Pierre Poilievre named Lantsman co-Deputy Leader along with Alberta MP Tim Uppal.

Electoral record

Thornhill

Personal life 
Lantsman is gay and was married in 2017. She suffers from severe Crohn's disease.

References

External links

1984 births
Living people
Conservative Party of Canada MPs
Members of the House of Commons of Canada from Ontario
Women members of the House of Commons of Canada
21st-century Canadian politicians
Jewish Canadian politicians
Jewish women politicians
21st-century Canadian women politicians
CBC Radio hosts
Canadian LGBT Members of Parliament
Canadian people of Russian-Jewish descent
CTV Television Network people
Lesbian politicians
Canadian LGBT broadcasters
LGBT Jews
People from Thornhill, Ontario
Politicians from Toronto
Canadian women radio hosts
Coca-Cola people
Deputy opposition leaders
Women deputy opposition leaders
21st-century Canadian LGBT people